Banco de Londres y Río de la Plata (in English, Bank of London and Río de la Plata) was a British financial institution, which operated in Buenos Aires from 1862 to 1923.

History 

The financial company Banco de Londres, Buenos Ayres y Río de la Plata was formed with English capitals in 1862. Its Board of directors was composed of G. W. Drabble, president, E. R. Duffield, managing director, and C. Hemery, as assistant manager. In Buenos Aires the board was chaired by Robert Thurburn and Thomas Hogg, who remained in their positions until about 1900.

The banking establishment was located on the corner of Piedad and Calle Reconquista, neighborhood of San Nicolás.

This bank came to have branches in Córdoba Province and Rosario, Santa Fe, and also operated in Montevideo, Uruguay.  In 1918, the Banco de Londres y Río de la Plata was acquired by Lloyds Bank.

References

External links 

www.argentina-rree.com

Banks established in 1862
Defunct banks of Argentina
Defunct banks of the United Kingdom
Economic history of Argentina
Río de la Plata
Buildings and structures in Buenos Aires